The 1956 FA Charity Shield was the 34th FA Charity Shield, an annual football match held between the winners of the previous season's Football League and FA Cup competitions. The match was contested by Manchester United, who had won the 1955–56 Football League, and Manchester City, who had won the 1955–56 FA Cup, at Maine Road, Manchester, on 24 October 1956. Manchester United won the match 1–0, Dennis Viollet scoring the winning goal. Manchester United goalkeeper David Gaskell made his debut for the club during the game, taking the place of injured goalkeeper Ray Wood, and, at the age of 16 years and 19 days, became the youngest player ever to play for the club.

This game was the first competitive floodlit Manchester derby.  The game was a break with tradition as Charity Shield games were typically played at the home ground of the League Champions, but as Old Trafford had yet to install lights, the game was played at Maine Road.  Prior to this the first floodlit Manchester derby was played on 26 February 1889 at the Belle Vue Athletic Ground.  The match was played in aid of the Hyde Coal Mine disaster.

Match details

See also
1955–56 Football League
1955–56 FA Cup
2011 FA Community Shield – contested by the same teams

References

FA Community Shield
Charity Shield 1956
Charity Shield 1956
Comm
Charity Shield 1956
Charity Shield 1956